Oncidium concolor is a species of orchid found from southern and southeastern Brazil to northeastern Argentina.

References

External links 

concolor
Orchids of Argentina
Orchids of Brazil